Ashdale Secondary College is an Independent Public secondary school in the Perth suburb of Darch, Western Australia. Established in 2009, the school has specialist programs for Information and Communication Technology (ICT) and for Autism Extension (AEP).

History
Because of the subdivision of the suburbs of Landsdale, Darch and Madeley, there was a need for a new school in the area. The school was originally known as Landsdale Secondary College, but the name was changed because of the changing nature of the Darch subdivision.

Ashdale Secondary College opened in 2009 with an intake of 140 year 8 students. Stage one of the building program was completed in October 2009, stage 2 in late 2011 and stage 3 at the end of 2014 to accommodate the new year 7s. In 2009, the school was one of the first in Western Australia to become an independent public school.

In November 2021, Ashdale Secondary College was awarded the Meritorious Leadership Award, for finishing second in the Governor’s School STEM Awards. The school was awarded WA Secondary School of the Year in later that month by the Department of Education.

Programs

ICT Specialist Program
Ashdale Secondary College has an Information and Communication Technology (ICT) program. Students in year 7 and 8 can also go through the STEM institute, the ICT program and the digital technology courses. In year 9 to 12 can follow 2 different pathways. A digital design and communication pathway, which focuses on photography and graphic design, such as logos, branding and artwork, and a software design and computer science pathway, which focuses on software and video game design.

Autism Extension Program
The Autism Extension Program (AEP) is one of 4 programs in Western Australia that is set up by the Department of Education's Centre for Inclusive Schooling. The program is for students with autism spectrum disorder. There are autism specialist teachers and education assistants available, and a homeroom where students can organise themselves for the school day, unwind to reduce anxiety, study during study periods and use as a safe space during recess and lunch. There are two programs offered within the Autism Extension Program. The Very Important Life Skills program (VILS), which includes talk sessions where they talk about things such as social thinking, making friends and expected and unexpected behaviours. The second program is the Community Access program, where students go on a weekly outing to local shops, and go on 2 excursions per term.

Academic results

Student numbers

See also

 List of schools in the Perth metropolitan area

References

Public high schools in Perth, Western Australia
Educational institutions established in 2009
2009 establishments in Australia